Umut apa or Umit apa (literally, "Mother Hope") was a renowned charismatic healer from Kazakhstan. She was the leader of a "healing commune" in Berezovka village of Pavlodar Region, close to Pavlodar city.

Umut apa is said to have restored health to tens of thousands of people between 1991 and 2005. Her commune came to be known as a holy land, and attracted pilgrims from other countries including Mongolia, China, Germany, Italy and Russia. The visitors would worship Umіt apa's ashes, pray in her mosque and receive treatment in Umut apa clinic. Her youngest daughter Bakhit (literally "Happiness") continued her activities.

In 2014, a sum of 29 million tenge was allocated towards improving the road leading to the commune. At the request of the local residents, a joint meeting of Akimat and Maslihat (the local representative bodies) passed a resolution to name the village "Umut Apa Aul".

References 

People from Pavlodar Region